Cinysca forticostata is a species of sea snail, a marine gastropod mollusk in the family Areneidae.

Description

Distribution
Cinysca forticostata can be found from Jeffery's Bay to East London, South Africa.

References

External links
 To World Register of Marine Species

Areneidae
Gastropods described in 1904